Vortura is the fourth album by New Zealand band Bailter Space. It was released in 1994. The songs were recorded at five studios, with all of the songs engineered by Bailter Space.  The final tracks were produced by Bailter Space and Paul Berry.

Vortura is the band's heaviest album, lyrically and musically, and marked the first time they recorded an album outside of their native New Zealand.  The song title "NO2" apparently is a reference to nitrogen dioxide, an air pollutant, though the song title is alternatively spelled as "No 2."  "Projects" chastizes "you in your ivory tower" for living well, while "people in projects, people living simply" lead ignored lives; this song coincided with the band's move to New York City from New Zealand.  "X" and "Projects" appeared on the B.E.I.P. EP, which came out several months in advance of Vortura.  A live version of "Projects" also came out on the Retro EP in 1995.

Track listing
All songs written by Bailter Space.
"Projects" – 5:06
"Process Paid" – 3:44
"X" – 4:47
"Voices" – 5:21
"NO2" – 3:26
"I.C.Y." – 2:30
"Dark Blue" – 3:14
"Shadow" – 4:03
"Galaxy" – 4:44
"Reactor" – 3:15
"Control" – 5:26

Personnel
Alister Parker – guitar, vocals
John Halvorsen – guitar, bass, vocals
Brent McLachlan – drums, sampler

References

Bailter Space albums
1994 albums
Matador Records albums
Flying Nun Records albums